Antal Puhalak (born 6 June 1963) is a retired Serbian footballer.

Career
Born in Subotica, at the time part of SR Serbia in SFR Yugoslavia, of ethnic Hungarian descent, he started his career playing in the Yugoslav First League in 1988 playing in his hometown club Spartak Subotica. In 1990, he came to Spain to play in Celta Vigo but, after playing only nine matches in half season he returned to Yugoslavia and played the season 1991–92 with FK Vojvodina. Next, he returned to Spartak where he will play until 2000, with the exception of the season 1994–95 which he played in Hungarian Nemzeti Bajnokság I, first half season with Kispest Honvéd FC and second with Parmalat FC. Playing in the First League of FR Yugoslavia he scored 50 goals between 1992-2000.

Personal life
His son, Nenad Puhalak (born 1992) is also a footballer.

References

External links
 Profile in YoJugueEnElCelta blog
 Top-scorers list in RSSSF

Living people
1963 births
Sportspeople from Subotica
Hungarians in Vojvodina
Yugoslav footballers
Serbian footballers
FK Spartak Subotica players
FK Vojvodina players
RC Celta de Vigo players
Expatriate footballers in Spain
Budapest Honvéd FC players
Expatriate footballers in Hungary
FK Hajduk Kula players
Association football forwards
Serbian expatriate sportspeople in Hungary
FK Sarajevo players